= Andrey Ditzel =

Russian poet and writer (born 1977)

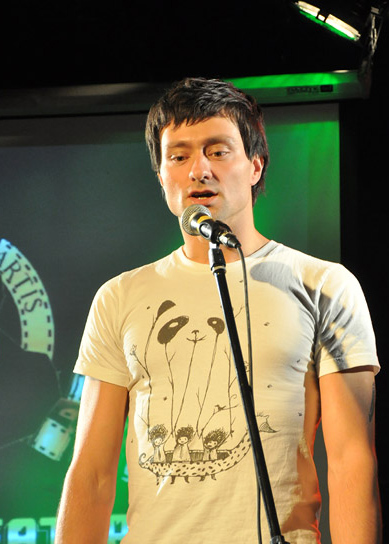
- Born: February 14, 1977 (age 49); Novosibirsk, USSR
- Occupations: Poet, writer, journalist

Andrey Ditzel (born February 14, 1977, Novosibirsk) is a Russian prose writer, poet, journalist and LGBT activist.

== Biography ==
Born in Novosibirsk on February 14, 1977. Graduate of the Siberian Academy of Public Administration with a degree in Public Relations, Licentiate in the Humanities Faculty of the University of Hamburg.

In the fall of 2001, he entered into a civil partnership with his partner in Germany. The first ever registration of a same-sex union of two Russian citizens caused a discussion in the electronic and print media.

Since 2002 he has been living and working in Germany. He is known as one of the organizers of the Russian-speaking column at the gay pride parade in Berlin. Member of the German Union of Journalists BDFJ.

Repeatedly entered the short lists of the literary competition named after NS Gumilyov "The Lost Tram", the project "Eshkol: Contemporary Israeli and Jewish Culture in Russia" and other competitions. Winner (2010) of the Russian-language poetic slam in Berlin, the international poetry competition "Emigrant Lyre 2014 \ 2015".

In May 2013, Dietzel's photo exhibition "Water Earth" was opened in the Novosibirsk City Center of Fine Arts as part of the Russian-Italian Museum Night.

== Publications ==
- The pier. Poems – St. Petersburg: Helikon Plus, 2001.
- Fingers. Poems. – Novosibirsk: Artel "Wasted Labor", 2003.
- G. Vlasov, A. Ditzel, K. Shcherbino, E. Zhumagulov. Moscow cuisine: Collection of poems. Foreword: S. Arutyunov. Afterword: D. Isakzhanov. – SPb: Helikon, 2005.
- SLAVISTIKA: Poems, diaries, stories. – SPb .: Artel "Wasted Labor", 2007
- Centaur vs Satyr. – Tver: KOLONNA Publications, 2009.
- Water Earth. Collection of poems. – Novosibirsk: "Left Bank", 2013.
